United States competed at the 2015 World Aquatics Championships in Kazan, Russia from 24 July to 9 August 2015.

Medalists

Diving

U.S. divers qualified for the individual spots and the synchronized teams at the World Championships.

Men

Women

Mixed

High diving

A maximum of six high divers have been selected to compete for the U.S. team at the World Championships.

Open water swimming

Eight U.S. open water swimmers have been qualified based on their performances at the USA Swimming Open Water National Championships. The official roster featured Olympic silver medalist Haley Anderson for the women's events, and 2012 Olympian Alex Meyer for the men's events.

Men

Women

Mixed

Swimming

U.S. swimmers earned qualifying standards in the following events (up to a maximum of 2 swimmers in each event at the A-standard entry time, and 1 at the B-standard):

The U.S. team consists of 47 swimmers (22 men and 25 women). Twenty-eight of these swimmers have competed at the previous World Championships in Barcelona including undisputed superstars Ryan Lochte, Missy Franklin, and Katie Ledecky, and notable Olympic champions Nathan Adrian, Tyler Clary, Anthony Ervin, and Matt Grevers.

Men

Women

Mixed

Synchronized swimming

Fourteen U.S. synchronized swimmers (one male and thirteen female) have been selected to compete in each of the following events at the World Championships.

Women

Mixed

Water polo

Men's tournament

Team roster

Merrill Moses
Nikola Vavić
Alex Obert
Jackson Kimbell
Alex Roelse
Luca Cupido
Josh Samuels
Tony Azevedo
Alex Bowen
Bret Bonanni
Jesse Smith
John Mann
McQuin Baron

Group play

Playoffs

Quarterfinals

5th–8th place semifinals

Seventh place game

Women's tournament

Team roster

Samantha Hill
Madeline Musselmann
Melissa Seidemann
Rachel Fattal
Alys Williams
Margaret Steffens
Courtney Mathewson
Kiley Neushul
Ashley Grossman
Kaleigh Gilchrist
Makenzie Fischer
Kami Craig
Ashleigh Johnson

Group play

Playoffs

Quarterfinals

Semifinals

Final

References

External links
Official website

Nations at the 2015 World Aquatics Championships
2015 in American sports
United States at the World Aquatics Championships